The 2003 World Rally Championship was the 31st season of the FIA World Rally Championship. The season consisted of 14 rallies. The drivers' world championship was won by Petter Solberg in a Subaru Impreza WRC, ahead of Sébastien Loeb and Carlos Sainz. The manufacturers' title was won by Citroën, ahead of Peugeot and Subaru.

Calendar

The 2003 championship was contested over fourteen rounds in Europe, Asia, South America and Oceania.

Teams and drivers

JWRC entries

PWRC entries

Results and standings

Drivers' championship

 Petter Solberg secured the drivers' championship title in Wales.

Manufacturers' championship
Manufacturer Teams must enter at least two cars. This allowed Manufacturers to have three or four cars registered on a single event, but only their best two result would count to the championship.

 Citroën secured the manufacturers' championship in Wales.
 Results in "()" means the car finished the rally, but two others of the same Manufacturer Team reached a better result.

JWRC Drivers' championship

Events

References

External links 

 FIA World Rally Championship 2003 at ewrc-results.com

World Rally Championship
World Rally Championship seasons